During the 2000–01 English football season, Wigan Athletic F.C. competed in the Football League Second Division.

Season summary
John Benson left after the end of the previous season, and former Arsenal manager Bruce Rioch was appointed in his place. Rioch had Wigan challenging for a play-off place but left in February; Wigan claimed that Rioch resigned, but Rioch insisted that he had been sacked. Former Manchester United player Steve Bruce took over and cemented Wigan's place in the top six, but they were knocked out of the play-offs by Reading in the semi-finals. Bruce then left to take charge of First Division Crystal Palace. Former Wigan striker Paul Jewell, who had previously led Bradford City to promotion to the Premier League but had failed to replicate the feat with Sheffield Wednesday, was appointed as his replacement.

Defender Arjan de Zeeuw was named Wigan's player of the season.

Transfers

In

Out

Loans in

Loans out

League

Results
Wigan Athletic's score comes first

Legend

Final league table

Second Division play-offs

Cups

FA Cup

League Cup

Football League Trophy

Squad
Squad at end of season

Left club during season

References

Wigan Athletic F.C. seasons
Wigan Athletic